Ahinsa is a 1979 Bollywood action film produced by Shiv Kumar and directed by Chand. The film stars Sunil Dutt and Rekha in lead roles.

Cast 
Sunil Dutt as Brijmohan "Birju"
Rekha as Radha
Ranjeet as Ramnath "Ram" / Raka
Nirupa Roy as Birju's Mother
Premnath as Shambhunath
Asrani as Pandit
P. Jairaj as Radha's Father
Jayshree T. as Coutesan

Soundtrack

External links 
 

1979 films
1970s Hindi-language films
1979 action films
Films scored by Kalyanji Anandji
Indian action films
Hindi-language action films